Cunningham Wash may refer to:

 Cunningham Wash (Arizona), see Butler Valley (Arizona)
 Cunningham Wash (Utah)